Thanjavur Marathi (Marathi: तंजावूर मराठी), also commonly spelled as Tanjore Marathi, is a dialect of Marathi spoken by Thanjavur Maharashtrians who migrated south, along with Shivaji's half brother Venkoji, to the areas surrounding the city of Thanjavur in India, back in the 17th century.

History
The history of Maratha rulers in South India possibly begins with Shahaji's attempt at setting up an independent kingdom in the Deccan plateau and his subsequent defeat in battle by Shahjahan around 1636. Shahaji made peace with Shahjahan and was posted in the deep south so as not to pose any challenge to Mughals. He finally became one of the top generals in the Adilshah's army, accepting a Jahagir in his court, being based in Bangalur (Present day Bangalore in Karnataka). Shahaji had one sons by Jijabai, Shivaji. He also had one son Venkoji (aka Vyankoji or Ekoji) by his second wife, Tukabai. Venkoji later ruled over the independent Maratha kingdom of Thanjavur which came to be known as the Thanjavur Maratha kingdom. Serfoji I Maharaja was one of the most famous Marathi kings of Tanjore.

The language spoken by this community, also known as "Thanjavur Marathi", is a scholarly dialect far removed from the present-day Marathi – it is stuck in the 17th century and is old Marathi. There are an estimated 100,000 people who speak the dialect. The various dialects of the language since its establishment are Kumbakonam and Namdev, each mutually intelligible with the other. There is some admixture of Tamil and almost all Thanjavur Marathi speakers are fluent in Tamil. Recent mass migration of people to major cities has diluted the language and it is now mostly spoken exclusively at home or with older generations.

Vocabulary and Dravidian influence
Tanjāvuri Marathi (TM) as spoken today can at best be described as a dialect of Marathi.
It has a considerably smaller vocabulary. A quick estimate indicates that TM has around 40,000 words, as compared to over 4,000 words in Marathi. TM has several words which have since disappeared from or gone out of fashion/ usage in Marathi. In addition, several words and usages from the major languages of Southern India, (mostly Tamil) have got into TM. Despite these changes, almost all the words of TM exist as they are in Marathi. The major differences between TM and Marathi can be traced to pronunciation, inflection, syntax and grammar. Historically, TM took a totally different route in its evolution over the past 250 years, influenced by the Dravidian languages and customs. TM had hardly used devanagari script. Instead the archaic modi script was used by the early TM speakers. Usage of Modi script was given up gradually, until as of today, the dialect is left with no script. Without the benefit of a written reference standard, each succeeding generation of TM speakers is being bequeathed a dialect with ever-increasing degeneration in pronunciation and inflection. There is an urgent need to arrest this trend by introducing Devanagari or the Tamil script and standardizing the dialect, according to some people.
 
Though it is believed by many that TM is influenced by Tamil, it is actually an early form of Marathi that was spoken in Maharashtra three centuries ago. In Tamil Nadu, it has remained insulated from the influence of 'related' languages and has therefore to a larger degree retained its original form. If the pure form of TM, as spoken by a few traditional families is taken into consideration, there are no Tamil words in it at all. Certain words such as kavāD for door, are used in Maharashtra not directly for door but in phrases like dnyānachi kawāDe ughaDi dzhāli (meaning 'The doors of knowledge opened.'), while kavāD is commonly used in Tanjore Marathi for 'door'.
 
The community which probably started the migration towards the South around the early 1600s with the movement of the Maratha armies towards the South, had managed to keep the language alive, is now fighting a losing battle. The grammar is remarkably like English where most objects are referred in the neutral gender. example kutra āla 'the dog came' is used for the male and female versions of the dog. Colloquial Marathi however refers to the masculine as kutrā ālā and to the feminine as kutri āli. In modern age, Shri. Ananda Rao Vashisht has been writing about TM language, he has made great contribution in preserving TM language. His works on Tanjore Marathi are available in www.vishnughar.blogspot.com and www.vishnugharforum.blogspot.com. Also, Smt. Kamal Sridhar prof. At Stonybrook univ New York has written papers, she has been active on Facebook Tanjavur Marathi Group.

Scripts
Historically Modi, Devanagari and Tamil, Telugu scripts have been used to write this dialect as found in old historical documents.

Speakers
The community or the social group which speaks this dialect is now spread over most of Southern India and elsewhere. Tanjavur District in Tamil Nadu can no longer lay claim to having the largest number of the community with it. It is estimated that less than 35% of the TM speaking population now lives in Tanjavur. The vast majority of TM speakers who live elsewhere have no connection with Tanjavur.
 
Its deceptive similarity to the Saurashtra language suggests a common Indo-Iranian root. The people's eventual assimilation into the Tamil community resulted in a unique culture which retains elements of both cultures and religious beliefs. Although members of this community have spread around some parts of the world today, the vast majority are still scattered in most parts throughout the Indian Subcontinent with a concentration in and around India, in Tamil Nadu. Most people of this community can trace their lineage back to the 17th century Maratha Empire. However, this community is spread across the entire South India from about Srikakulam in the Northeast of Andhra Pradesh, to Tirunelveli in the South of Tamil Nadu, to Tiruvananthapuram in Kerala to some parts of Southeast Karnataka. Divided by sects, the only common factor is the dying common language which the current generation is slowly losing to the local languages. In the modern age, there are very popular ethnic and cultural groups under the name of "Tanjavur Marathi Group" started by Shri. Ravi Shelvankar which has more than 1000 worldwide members on Facebook focused to integrate Tanjavur Marathi members worldwide, in trying to retain its identity, culture and dialect http://www.deshasthas.org (non-profit organization). The Mahratta Education Fund (MEF) is a non-profit organization working for the educational advancement and economic amelioration of the Tamilnadu Marathi speaking community. Towards this objective, MEF awards scholarships to deserving Tamilnadu Marathi speaking boys and girls to pursue their higher education. The Maharatta Education Fund was started in the year 1912 by a group of people headed by Sri E. Vinayaka Rao, with a view to bringing together the Tamilnadu Maharastrians.

Illustration

See also
 
Native Tanjore Marathi speakers have begun to revive the language. Such efforts can be studied at a few websites mentioned herein-below.

References 

Marathi language
Languages of Tamil Nadu